Black bronze can refer to:

Hepatizon, also known as black Corinthian bronze
Shakudō, a Japanese decorative billon